The Bard Springs Dam No. 2 is a historic recreational support facility in Ouachita National Forest. It is located at the Bard Springs recreation site, southeast of Mena and north of Athens in Polk County, off County Road 82 and Forest Road 106 on the banks of Blaylock Creek. It is made of fieldstone, and has a series of staggered steps at its base to reduce erosion. It was built in 1936 by a crew of the Civilian Conservation Corps, and is one of four surviving CCC structures (the others are a second dam, bathhouse, and a picnic shelter) in the immediate area.

The dam was listed on the National Register of Historic Places in 1993.

See also
National Register of Historic Places listings in Polk County, Arkansas

References

Dams completed in 1936
Buildings and structures in Polk County, Arkansas
Ouachita National Forest
Dams on the National Register of Historic Places in Arkansas
Dams in Arkansas
National Register of Historic Places in Polk County, Arkansas
1936 establishments in Arkansas